Karin Jacobsen (1924–1989) was a German actress and screenwriter. She was married to the actor Carl-Heinz Schroth and the film producer Gero Wecker.

Selected filmography
 Artists' Blood (1949)
 Furioso (1950)
 Weekend in Paradise (1952)
 Men at a Dangerous Age (1954)
 The Telephone Operator (1954)ʎ
 The Bordello (1971)

References

Bibliography
 Baer, Hester. Dismantling the Dream Factory: Gender, German Cinema, and the Postwar Quest for a New Film Language. Berghahn Books, 2012.

External links

1924 births
1989 deaths
German stage actresses
German film actresses
German television actresses
People from Düren
Film people from North Rhine-Westphalia
20th-century German screenwriters